Sodium bisulfite (or sodium bisulphite, sodium hydrogen sulfite) is a chemical mixture with the approximate chemical formula NaHSO3. Sodium bisulfite in fact is not a real compound, but a mixture of salts that dissolve in water to give solutions composed of sodium and bisulfite ions.  It appears in form of white or yellowish-white crystals with an odor of sulfur dioxide. For properties of sodium bisulfite, refer to the table located to the right. Regardless of its ill-defined nature, sodium bisulfite is used in many different industries such a food additive with E number E222 in the food industry, a reducing agent in the cosmetic industry, and a decomposer of residual hypochlorite used in the bleaching industry.

Synthesis
Sodium bisulfite solutions can be prepared by treating a solution of suitable base, such as sodium hydroxide or sodium bicarbonate with sulfur dioxide.
SO2  +  NaOH  →  NaHSO3
SO2 + NaHCO3 → NaHSO3 + CO2

Attempts to crystallize the product yield Sodium metabisulfite (also called sodium disulfite), Na2S2O5.

Upon dissolution of the metabisulfite in water, bisulfite is regenerated:
Na2S2O5  +  H2O   →   2 Na+ + 2 HSO3−

Sodium bisulfite is formed during the Wellman-Lord process.

Uses

Cosmetics
The safety of cosmetic products is constantly in question as the components are always changing or being discovered as a possibly harmful substance. The sulfite components of cosmetic ingredients, such as sodium bisulfite, underwent clinical trials to find out their safety in cosmetic formulations. Sodium bisulfite functions as a reducing agent and furthermore as a hair-waiving/straightening agent. As of 1998, sodium bisulfite was used in 58 different cosmetic products including hair conditioners, moisturizers, and hair dyes.

In a cosmetic context, the reducing ability of sodium bisulfite is used to prevent discoloration, bleach food starches, and delay spoilage of the product. Since the sulfite molecule was used in so many compounds in the 1990s, the EPA, FDA, and American Conference of Governmental Industrial Hygienists established a working place threshold limit value for sulfur dioxide of 2ppm averaged over 8 hours, and a 3-hour level of 5ppm. Even with this threshold established, the FDA recognized sodium bisulfite as a "generally recognized as safe" compound.

A final examination on the carcinogenicity, genotoxicity, oral toxicity, and cellular toxicity on consumed sodium bisulfite was conducted using living subjects such as mice and rats. The International Agency for Research on Cancer concluded that there was inadequate evidence to that that sodium bisulfite was carcinogenic. Under specific conditions such as acidity and concentration level, sodium bisulfite was able to cause negative alterations to the genome such as catalyzing transamination, and induce sister-chromatid exchanges suggesting possible genotoxicity. In a study using Osbourne-Mendel strain rats, it was concluded that oral toxicity was not significant if the consumed concentration was less than 0.1% (615ppm as SO2). A study done by Servalli, Lear, and Cottree in 1984 found that sodium bisulfite did not produce membrane fusion in hepatic and murine glial cells and human fibroblasts so there is no oral toxicity. These clinical studies concluded that sodium bisulfite was safe to use in cosmetic formulations.

Food industry
Similar to the cosmetic industry, the European Commission requested the European Food Safety Authority (EFSA) to review and determine if the use of sulfites as food additives was still safe in light of new scientific technology and information. Since sodium bisulfite is a known sulfonating compound, it underwent the experimentation. Based on clinical experiments using rats and mice, the World Health Organization Expert Committee on Food Additives came to the conclusion that 0-0.7mg of sulfur dioxide equivalent/kg of body weight per day will cause no harm to an individual consuming this compound as a food additive. The genotoxicity and carcinogenicity were examined just as in the cosmetic trials and in both cases, no potential for concern with respect to the sulfites were found.

The production of sodium bisulfite used as a food additive can be described by the combination of sulfur dioxide gas with aqueous sodium hydroxide solution in usual absorber apparatuses. In order to analyze the amount of free sulfites in food as a result of the sulfonation of sodium bisulfite, multiple methods can be used including the Monier-Williams type procedure, HPLC after extraction, and Flow Injection analysis. Overall, the use of sodium bisulfite in the food industry as an additive and antioxidant is safe and beneficial to the lifespan of processed foods.

Textile industry
An antichlor is a substance used to decompose residual hypochlorite or chlorine after chlorine-based bleaching, in order to prevent ongoing reactions with, and therefore damage to, the material that has been bleached. Sodium bisulfite is an example of an antichlor. Historically, sodium bisulfite has been used in the textile industry, cosmetic industry, food industry, and more.

Antichlors are very useful in the textile industry because bleaching of compounds using chlorine is a standard practice. However, the use of sodium bisulfite in the decomposition of excess hypochlorite can lead to harmful byproducts when it comes into contact with water at the concentrations present for industrial use. Contact with these dangerous byproducts or even strong concentrations of sodium bisulfite can be harmful to the environment and contact with the skin. Strong concentrations of these compounds can contaminate ecosystems, harm animals, and cause contact dermatitis with industrial workers. The concentrations that could result in these outcomes are much stronger than the concentrations discussed in the cosmetic and food industry.

See also
 Sodium metabisulfite
 Calcium bisulfite
 Potassium bisulfite
 Croscarmellose sodium
 Sulfurous acid

References

Sodium compounds
Bisulfites
Reagents for organic chemistry
Food additives
Reducing agents
E-number additives